The 2020–21 Saudi Second Division was the 45th season of the Saudi Second Division since its establishment in 1976. The season started on 30 October 2020 as a consequence of the postponement of the previous season's conclusion due to the COVID-19 pandemic. The group stage draw was held on 22 September 2020. The final was played on 19 April 2021 between Al-Akhdoud and Al-Orobah. Al-Akhdoud defeated Al-Orobah 4–2 on penalties (3–3 after extra time) to win their second title and first since 1992.

Overview

Changes
As a result of the COVID-19 pandemic, all football competitions in Saudi Arabia were suspended until further notice on 14 March 2020. On 11 June 2020, the Saudi Football Federation announced that the Third Division would be abandoned at the quarter-finals stage and that the remaining 8 teams would be promoted to the Second Division. They also announced that the number of teams in the Second Division would be increased from 24 teams to 28 teams.

Team changes
A total of 28 teams are contesting the league, including 16 sides from the 2019–20 season, 4 relegated teams from the MS League, and 8 promoted teams from the 2019–20 Third Division.

The following teams have changed division since the 2019–20 season

To Second Division

Promoted from the Third Division

 Al-Dahab
 Al-Lewa
 Al-Najma
 Al-Selmiyah
 Al-Taraji
 Al-Zulfi
 Bisha
 Kumait

Relegated from MS League
 Al-Mujazzal
 Al-Taqadom
 Al-Ansar
 Hetten

From Second Division
Promoted to MS League
 Hajer
 Al-Diriyah
 Arar
 Al-Sahel

Relegated to the Third Division
 Al-Anwar
 Al-Jubail
 Al-Suqoor
 Al-Dera'a

Teams
;Group A

Group B

Foreign players
The number of foreign players is limited to 2 per team.

Players name in bold indicates the player is registered during the mid-season transfer window.

Group A

League table

Results

Group B

League table

Results

Third place play-off
Bisha, who finished 2nd in Group A will face Al-Kholood who finished 2nd in Group B to decide the third-placed team.

Final
The winners of each group will play a one-legged final to decide the champion of the 2020–21 Second Division. As winners of Group A, Al-Akhdoud will face Al-Orobah, the winners of Group B. Al-Akhdoud defeated Al-Orobah 4–2 on penalties to win their second title.

Statistics

Top scorers

Hat-tricks 

Note
(H) – Home; (A) – Away

Number of teams by region

See also
 2020–21 Professional League
 2020–21 Prince Mohammad bin Salman League

References

3
Saudi Second Division seasons